Kedar Bodas is an Indian classical vocalist belonging to the Gwalior gharana. He was described by Scroll.in as a "master khayal singer."

Bodas was born into a family of musicians. He received early training from his grandfather Lakshmanrao Bodas and his father Narayanrao Bodas. He has also received training from Pandurang Salunke, Shreedhar Padhye, Ashok Ranade, C.P. Rele, and T.D. Janorikar. As a child, he also learned to play the tabla, but eventually focused on vocals.

He has performed across India, and composed the music for six documentary films.

In addition to his work as a performer, he is also a musical scholar and a linguist. He did a four-year advanced course in Russian, which helped expose him to Western Classical and Russian folk music.

He received the Mallikarjun Mansur award in 2018.

References 

Hindustani singers
Gwalior gharana
21st-century Indian male classical singers
Year of birth missing (living people)
Living people